The men's doubles event at the 1991 French Open tennis tournament was held from 27 May until 9 June 1991 on the outdoor clay courts at the Stade Roland Garros in Paris, France. John Fitzgerald and Anders Järryd won the title, defeating Goran Ivanišević and Petr Korda in the final.

Seeds

Draw

Finals

Top half

Section 1

Section 2

Bottom half

Section 3

Section 4

References

External links
 Association of Tennis Professionals (ATP) – main draw
1991 French Open – Men's draws and results at the International Tennis Federation

Men's Doubles
French Open by year – Men's doubles